The Snake River Valley Conference (SRV) is a high school athletic conference in the Idaho High School Activities Association. The conference competes at the 3A level in all sports.

2018-20 Members
Fruitland High School, Fruitland
Homedale High School, Homedale
Parma High School, Parma
Payette High School, Payette
Weiser High School, Weiser

Former members
Bishop Kelly High School, Boise (4A)
Emmett High School, Emmett (4A)
Kuna High School, Kuna (4A)
McCall-Donnelly High School, McCall (2A)
Middleton High School, Middleton (4A)
Vallivue High School, Caldwell (4A)

References

High school sports associations in the United States